"Odd One" is the second single from Sick Puppies' third album Tri-Polar, which impacted rock radio on 10 November 2009. According to the band's Twitter, the video was filmed on November 25. According to pictures posted on the band's Twitter and a video clip on YouTube in the following days, the video was filmed at a skate park. In a live web interview on 9 February 2010, vocalist Shimon Moore stated that "Odd One" narrowly beat out "Riptide" as Tri-Polars second single, much to the delight of the band who supported "Odd One" becoming a single because of its strong lyrical message.

Music video
A trailer for the video can be seen on their YouTube page.

The full video premiere of Odd One was on Wednesday 20 January 2010 on the mtvU website.

The video shows the band performing at a skatepark and a love story. The protagonist of the video is girl who has powers that could kill and bring people back from the dead. Her powers stop her from touching other people so she wears yellow rubber gloves.

Track listing

Charts

Weekly charts

Year-end charts

References

Sick Puppies songs
2009 singles
2009 songs
Songs written by Shimon Moore
Song recordings produced by Rock Mafia
Virgin Records singles
Songs written by Tim James (musician)
Songs written by Antonina Armato
Songs written by Emma Anzai